Alan Frederick Sherlock OBE, OAM (7 June 1938 – 11 December 2016) was an Australian politician.

A former Scout Commissioner, Sherlock was elected to the Legislative Assembly of Queensland in 1986 as the Liberal member for Ashgrove serving one term before his defeat in 1989. He subsequently contested the federal seat of Petrie unsuccessfully in 1993.

In January 2014, Sherlock was awarded the Medal of the Order of Australia (OAM) in the General Division for service to the Scouting movement and to the community.  He died on 11 December 2016 at the age of 78.

Community 

Alan Sherlock was appointed Board Director of the Duke of Edinburgh's International Award, Queensland, Australia (1998-2004) and Acting Chair and Chair (2004-2005).

References

1938 births
2016 deaths
20th-century Australian politicians
Australian Officers of the Order of the British Empire
Australian pharmacists
Liberal Party of Australia members of the Parliament of Queensland
Members of the Queensland Legislative Assembly
University of Queensland alumni
Australian Anglicans
People from Rockhampton